Echo candens is a species of broad-winged damselfly in the family Calopterygidae.

References

Further reading

 

Calopterygidae
Articles created by Qbugbot
Insects described in 2015